Charles-Philogène Tschaggeny (1815 – 1894), was a Belgian painter.

Biography
He was born in Brussels and was the brother of Edmund Tschaggeny. He was the pupil of Eugène Joseph Verboeckhoven and is known for genre works with horses.	

He died in Sint-Joost-ten-Node.

References
	
	
Charles-Philogène Tschaggeny on Artnet	
	
	

1815 births
1894 deaths
Artists from Brussels
19th-century Belgian painters
19th-century Belgian male artists